e-Governance Academy (eGA, Estonian: E-riigi Akadeemia Sihtasutus) is a non-profit foundation that assists public sector institutions worldwide in digital transformation. The organization was founded in 2002, by a joint initiative of the Government of Estonia, Open Society Institute (OSI), and the United Nations Development Program (UNDP).

eGA is an advisory observer to the Secure Identity Alliance (SIA), member of the Estonian Roundtable for Development Cooperation and partner of the Global Forum on Cyber Expertise (GFCE).

Board and experts 
The foundation is governed by the Supervisory Board that includes researchers, top-level managers, and senior officials of Estonia and the European Union: Siim Raie, Paul Timmers, Andre Krull, Margus Kolga, and Toomas Hendrik Ilves, the fourth President of Estonia (2006-2016).

eGA’s team includes former senior Estonian government decision-makers who have taken part in the creation of e-Estonia: Linnar Viik, Hannes Astok, Arvo Ott, Uuno Vallner, Liia Hänni.

Activities 
So far, eGA has provided assistance and consultations to more than 130 countries around the world, including Ukraine, Benin, Mongolia, Sierra Leone, Barbados, the Cayman Islands, Guyana, the Faroe Islands, India, etc. Partnering with the Australia’s Cyber Cooperation Programme and the Australian Strategic Policy Institute, the e-Governance Academy assessed the digital transformation capabilities and resources of the Pacific Islands. Together with the International and Ibero-American Foundation for Administration and Public Policie (FIIAP), it supports digital transformation in Ukraine and its harmonisation with the EU Digital Single Market.

The organisation has assisted the implementation of the Estonian origin secured data exchange platform X-Road in Benin, Faroe Islands, Palestine, Kyrgyzstan, and Ukraine.

Trainings on e-democracy and cyber security have been provided for government officials in Ukraine and Moldova.

A joint venture with Mitsubishi UFJ Research and Consulting Co., Ltd (MURC) was established to provide digital transformation services for governments in Japan and the Asian region.

National Cyber Security Index 
eGA created and maintains the National Cyber Security Index (NCSI). Ranking more than 160 countries, it is a detailed cyber security assessment tool, that has also been listed among the International Good Cyber Stories.

e-Governance Conference 
The e-Governance Conference is an annual event that brings together digital transformation makers and experts from developing countries around the world.

Publications 
The handbook “e-Estonia: e-Governance in Practice” covers the main aspects of creating and managing digital society. The handbook “e-Estonia: e-Governance in Practice” became a bestselling book in Japan.

eGA has published a review on the state of e-democracy and cyber security of the Eastern Partnership countries, analyzed and evaluated the current state of e-governance in African countries and compiled recommendations to develop the e-government in Australia.

References 

Non-governmental organizations
Organizations based in Estonia